Current is a 2009 romantic comedy drama Telugu film directed by Palnati Surya Pratap. It stars Sushanth and Sneha Ullal in the lead roles. Devi Sri Prasad provided the music while Vijay Kumar C. provided the cinematography. Marthand K. Venkatesh handled the editing department.

Plot
Sushanth (Sushanth) is a happy-go-lucky college student whose philosophy of life is summed up as Forget Yesterday, Enjoy Today & Worry Not about Tomorrow which keeps him happy but worries his parents to no end. A transfer brings the entire family to Hyderabad where he falls for his college classmate Sneha (Sneha Ullal) on day one. A determined Sushanth woos her successfully. Now, Sneha's philosophy of life runs totally opposite of Sushanth and very soon reality sets in. His attitude ruins his marriage prospects with Sneha and they end up separating. The second half of the movie is all about how they try to fall out of love while making compromises to their philosophies. It ends well with both accepting that Love is above everything else in life.

Cast

 Sushanth as Sushanth
 Sneha Ullal as Sneha
 Raghu Babu as Guava seller
 Tanikella Bharani as Sushanth's father
 Brahmanandam as Sushanth's uncle
 Vennela Kishore as Bose
Rashmi Gautam as Geeta
 Jhansi as Sneha's aunt
 Shankar Melkote
 Charan Raj as Sneha's father
 Telangana Shakuntala as Sweeper Swarnakka
 Shafi as Shafi
 Sudha as Sushanth's mother
 Kondavalasa Lakshmana Rao as Sneha's father's PA
 Shakeela as brothel owner
 Prudhviraj as Police Officer
 Vijay Sai as Giri
 Satyam Rajesh
 Ravi Prakash
 Srinivasa Reddy

Soundtrack

The audio was Launched on 9 June 2009. The special guests for the Launch were Nagarjuna, Seenu Vytla and Sekhar Kammula along with Palnati Surya Pratap, Chintalapuri Srinivasa Rao, Devi Sri Prasad, Bhaskarabhatla Ravi Kumar and Ramajogaiah Sastri. The soundtrack was received well.

References

External links

2000s Telugu-language films
2009 romantic comedy films
2009 films
Indian romantic comedy films